Dystrophic calcification (DC) is the calcification occurring in degenerated or necrotic tissue, as in hyalinized scars, degenerated foci in leiomyomas, and caseous nodules. This occurs as a reaction to tissue damage, including as a consequence of medical device implantation. Dystrophic calcification can occur even if the amount of calcium in the blood is not elevated (a systemic mineral imbalance would elevate calcium levels in the blood and all tissues) and cause metastatic calcification. Basophilic calcium salt deposits aggregate, first in the mitochondria, then progressively throughout the cell.  These calcifications are an indication of previous microscopic cell injury, occurring in areas of cell necrosis when activated phosphatases bind calcium ions to phospholipids in the membrane.

Calcification in dead tissue
Caseous necrosis in T.B. is most common site of dystrophic calcification.
Liquefactive necrosis in chronic abscesses may get calcified.
Fat necrosis following acute pancreatitis or traumatic fat necrosis in breasts results in deposition of calcium soaps.
Infarcts may undergo D.C.
Thrombi, especially in veins, may produce phleboliths.
Haematomas in the vicinity of bones may undergo D.C.
Dead parasites like schistosoma eggs may calcify.
Congenital toxoplasmosis, CMV or rubella may be seen on X-ray as calcifications in the brain.

Calcification in degenerated tissue 
Dense scars may undergo hyaline degeneration and calcification.
Atheroma in aorta and coronaries frequently undergo calcification.
Cysts can show calcification.
Calcinosis cutis is condition in which there are irregular nodular deposits of calcium salts in skin and subcutaneous tissue.
Senile degenerative changes may be accompanied by calcification.
The inherited disorder pseudoxanthoma elasticum may lead to angioid streaks with calcification of Bruch's membrane, the elastic tissue below the retinal ring.

See also
Calcinosis
Monckeberg's arteriosclerosis

References

Histopathology